Business for Britain was a eurosceptic campaign group which sought a renegotiation of the relationship between the United Kingdom (UK) and the European Union (EU). The campaign was founded in April 2013 by Matthew Elliott.

History
The company was founded by Matthew Elliott who had founded the TaxPayers' Alliance in 2004. Elliott served as the chief executive of the organisation.

The group published research on the voting record of the UK in the European Parliament in 2014, called Measuring Britain's influence in the Council of Ministers. It cited 55 times that the UK government had rejected a proposal which then went on to be passed by the EU Council. The fact-checking organisation Full Fact felt that this did not show a full picture as often proposals are rejected before being presented to the Council and that there was research to show that a majority of decisions were taken before a vote in the Council. In November 2014, they published a letter signed by more than 500 business leaders which called for a referendum on the UK's membership of the EU. In June 2015, the Business for Britain Board agreed to form Vote Leave.

Publications
 Measuring Britain's influence in the Council of Ministers (2014) PDF

See also
Campaign for an Independent Britain
Conservatives for Britain
Democracy Movement
Grassroots Out (GO)
Labour Leave
Leave Means Leave
Leave.EU
Vote Leave

References

2013 establishments in the United Kingdom
Euroscepticism in the United Kingdom
Organisations based in the City of Westminster
2016 United Kingdom European Union membership referendum